Saulieu is a rural commune in the Côte-d'Or department in the Bourgogne-Franche-Comté region in eastern France. Its 2,413 inhabitants (in 2017) call themselves Sédélociens.

Capital of the Morvan, situated within the Morvan Regional Natural Park, Saulieu lies 250 km southeast of Paris on the RN6 road.

History
This walled town has existed since Roman times when it was known as Sidolocus (or Sedelocus), as seen on the tombs and engravings that can be found in the hills overlooking the modern town. Every Saturday morning a unique market is held in the square selling goods of many kinds.

Church
The Basilica of Saint Andoche, noted for its west portal and carved capitals depicting biblical stories and religious teachings, was founded as an abbey church in the 6th century. Rebuilt as a collegiate church in the 12th century, it became a Minor Basilica in 1919.

There are over 60 carved capitals in the basilica, several of which have narrative figures. Some of the capitals are the Flight into Egypt (Matthew 2:13-15), Balaam (Numbers 23-24), The Risen Christ (John 20:11-18; Matthew 28:1-10), Temptation of Christ (Mt 4:1-11; Mk 1:12-13; Lk 4:1-13) and the capital of the "Cockfight in the south arcade, fourth pier (facing the aisle)".

Population

Sights
 Saint Andoche Basilica, a Romanesque church built around 1130–1140.
 Tomb of Saint Andoche, reputed to be writer of the evangelistary of Charlemagne.
 Cemetery of the church of Saint Saturnin with Gallo-Roman graves.
 François Pompon regional museum.

International relations
 Caprino Veronese, Italy
 Gau-Algesheim, Germany, since 1964.

Personalities
 Yves Afonso, actor
 Bernard Loiseau, chef
 François Pompon, sculptor
 Claude Sallier, philologist and churchman

See also
Communes of the Côte-d'Or department
Parc naturel régional du Morvan

References

External links

Adrian Fletcher's Paradoxplace – Basilica of St-Andoche, Saulieu - Photos
Saulieu on the site Bourgogne Romane
Sacred Destinations an educational and travel resource – Basilica of St. Andoche in Saulieu, Burgundy - Photos
L'abbatiale Saint-Andoche Saulieu – Basilica of St. Andoche in Saulieu, Burgundy 

Communes of Côte-d'Or
Burgundy
Côte-d'Or communes articles needing translation from French Wikipedia